Correlative ("corelative," UK spelling) is the term adopted by Wesley Newcomb Hohfeld to describe the philosophical relationships between fundamental legal concepts in jurisprudence.

Hohfeldian analysis 

Hohfeld was concerned that there was some ambiguity in the explanation of the similarities and differences between concepts in law. Hence, with the focus on the nature of rights, he proposed a system of analysis based on "jural correlatives" and "jural opposites". A correlative is where two concepts are logically consistent and the one necessarily implies the other. When two concepts are Hohfeldian opposites (technically, logical contradictions), they are mutually exclusive.

Thus, if A has a right with regard to B, an analysis of their relationship from B's point of view must imply that B has a duty to A. An owner of land may hold four distinct entitlements: rights, privileges, powers, and immunities. Hohfeld linked each entitlement to a correlative and its opposite:

In practice
Jurists such as Mickey Dias and Hohfeld have declared that rights and duties are jural corelatives, which means that if someone has a right, someone else owes a duty to him. This reasoning of Dias' was used in Murphy v Brentwood District Council (1991) to disapprove  Lord Denning MR's judgment in Dutton v Bognor Regis Urban District Council (1972).

See also 

 Civil rights

References 

 Hohfeld, W. N. Fundamental Legal Conceptions as Applied in Judicial Reasoning, ed. by W.W. Cook (1919); reprint, New Haven, CT: Yale University Press, (1964).

Philosophy of law
Human rights